Runaway Daughters may refer to:

Runaway Daughters (1956 film), a film drama
Runaway Daughters (1994 film), a television film